Frederick J. "Fred" Taral (August 2, 1867 – February 13, 1925) was an American Hall of Fame jockey.

Jockey career
Taral began his career in racing in the 1880s at small racetracks in Oklahoma.

In 1883, he rode his first competitive thoroughbred in a race at Washington Park.

By 1889 he was among the 24-member jockey colony at the Fair Grounds Race Course in New Orleans and competed in his first Kentucky Derby.

According to The Boston Post, he was the highest-earning jockey in the US in 1894, with an estimated combined payout of US$20,000. Reports published at the time suggested he had even completed one season with a broken arm.

New York State's passage of the Hart–Agnew anti-betting law in 1908 resulted in racetracks statewide struggling to stay in business. As a result, many stable owners, trainers, and jockeys began leaving to work in Europe. Fred Taral left racing in the United States and riding in Austria-Hungary won the 1908 Königspreis (King's Prize), the most important race in that country. He also rode and trained in Germany where he rode Macdonald to victory in the 1909 Deutsches Derby. He returned home following the outbreak of World War I.

For owner James R. Keene, Taral rode  future Hall of Famers Domino and Henry of Navarre. He also rode Domino against Henry of Navarre to a dead heat in an 1894 match race. On different horses, that year Taral won the New York Handicap Triple, capturing the Brooklyn Handicap, Metropolitan Handicap and the Suburban Handicap. In all, Taral won the Brooklyn Handicap on three occasions and the Metropolitan Handicap twice. He was also a two-time winner of the Travers, Champagne and Withers Stakes.

In the pre-Triple Crown era, Fred Taral had back-to-back wins in the Preakness Stakes. He first won it in 1894 aboard Assignee and in 1895 he won his second Preakness plus the Belmont Stakes with the colt Belmar. In 1899 he won the Kentucky Derby aboard Manuel.

Training career
Following his retirement from riding in 1908, Fred Taral pursued a career as a trainer. Among his clients was the Riviera Stable owned by Victor Vivaudou for whom he trained notable runners Fabian and Miss Star.

Fred Taral died of pneumonia in 1925. He was buried in the Maple Grove Cemetery in Kew Gardens, New York.  In 1955 he was part of the inaugural class inducted into the newly created United States Racing Hall of Fame.

References

1867 births
1925 deaths
American jockeys
People from Peoria, Illinois
American people of French descent
United States Thoroughbred Racing Hall of Fame inductees